Jordhy Eduardo Thompson Dávila (born 10 August 2004) is a Chilean footballer who plays as a winger for Colo-Colo and the Chile national under-20 football team.

Club career
A left-footed winger from the Colo-Colo youth system, Thompson made his debut in a Chilean Primera División match against Ñublense on 1 May 2021 at the age of sixteen, due to Colo-Colo's first team having seventeen players unavailable due to the COVID-19 pandemic. He scored his first professional goal in a match against Deportes Copiapó on 22 January 2023.

International career
In December 2021, he represented Chile U20 at Copa Rául Coloma Rivas, playing three matches. In September 2022, he made 2 appearances in the Costa Cálida Supercup. In the 2022 South American Games, he made one appearance.

Personal life
He is the cousin-nephew of the former professional footballer Christian Thompson, a former Universidad de Chile player. On March 15th 2023, videos surfaced on social media of Thompson committing domestic violence on his then girlfriend at a nightclub. Colo Colo suspended the player indefinitely  from all first team activities due to the incident, and sent him to psychological counseling.

References

External links
 
 Jordhy Thompson at asu2022.org.py 

2004 births
Living people
People from Antofagasta
Chilean footballers
Chile under-20 international footballers
Chilean Primera División players
Colo-Colo footballers
Association football forwards